Nancy-sur-Cluses (literally Nancy on Cluses) is a commune in the Haute-Savoie department in the Auvergne-Rhône-Alpes region in south-eastern France. In 2018 Nancy-sur-Cluses counted 462 inhabitants.

Tourism
Romme-sur-Cluses is a 1292 m high resort located at 10 km from Cluses. Nancy-sur-Cluses provides also a large choice of familiar hikes around the Aravis massif of mountains.

See also
Communes of the Haute-Savoie department

References

Communes of Haute-Savoie